The old Israeli shekel, then known as the shekel (formally sheqel, . It was replaced by the Israeli new shekel at a ratio of 1,000:1 on 1 January 1986. The old shekel was short-lived due to its hyperinflation. The old shekel was subdivided into 100 new agorot. The shekel sign was  although it was more commonly denominated as S or IS.

The Israeli old shekel replaced the Israeli pound (IL), which had been used until 24 February 1980, at the rate of IS 1 shekel to IL10.

History
Development of a new currency to be known as the shekel (properly, sheqel) was approved by the Israeli Knesset on 4 June 1969. The governors of the Bank of Israel did not consider the time ripe until November 1977, when studies for its implementation began. Prime Minister Menachem Begin and Minister of Finance Simcha Erlich approved a proposal to redenominate the Israeli pound in May 1978; the proposal called for the currency to be exactly similar except for the removal of a zero from the inflated pound and agorot denominations.

The shekel and new agora became legal tender on 22 February 1980 and went into circulation two days later. The official exchange rate at time of introduction was US$1 = IS 3.89 = IL38.88. Initial denominations were IS 1, IS 5, IS 10, and IS 50, but over the next five years inflation led to another five: IS 100, IS 500, IS 1,000, IS 5,000, and IS 10,000. New coin and bill designs were selected through competitions among graphic designers. Beginning with the IS 500 issue, the size of the notes was standardized and the denominations differentiated by color and design. A transparent part was added to discourage counterfeiting and elements for the blind were added.

Inflationary pressure did not ease. By the end of 1980, the shekel had already lost about half of its value (US$1 = IS 7.55). In 1981, the value of Israeli currency continued to fall, reaching IS 15.60 per U.S. dollar at the end of the year. At the end of 1982, the exchange rate was IS 33.65 = US$1 and was falling still. The following shows the official exchange rate of one U.S. dollar in specific periods of time at the end of the period:
June 1983: IS 47.52
December 1983: IS 107.77
March 1984: IS 153.26
June 1984: IS 236.40
September 1984: IS 401.34
December 1984: IS 638.71
March 1985: IS 858.50
June 1985: IS 1262.40
By August 1985, the exchange rate for one U.S. dollar reached IS 1500. The new Israeli shekel replaced the shekel following its hyperinflation and the enactment of the economic stabilization plan of 1985 which brought inflation under control. It became the currency of Israel on 4 September 1985, removing three zeros from the old notes.

The old shekel is no longer in circulation, has been demonetized, and is not exchangeable to current legal tender by the Bank of Israel.

Coins
These preserved the appearance of the similar coins under the pound but were worth 10 times as much.

 Note that all dates on Israeli coins are given in the Hebrew calendar and are written in Hebrew numerals.

Banknotes
The initial series of banknotes in 1980 were for the denominations of  IS 5, IS 10, and IS 50 and preserved the appearance of the IL10, IL50, IL100 and IL500 notes which they replaced.

See also
 Bank of Israel
 Economy of Israel

References

Citations

Bibliography

External links

 Bank of Israel catalog of Israeli currency since 1948

Sheqel
Modern obsolete currencies
1980 establishments in Israel
1985 disestablishments in Israel
1980s economic history
Cultural depictions of David Ben-Gurion
Cultural depictions of Golda Meir